Porcelain Museum may refer to:

 Museo delle Porcellane, Florence, Italy
 Riga Porcelain Museum, Riga, Latvia
 Worcester Porcelain Museum, Worcester, England